Huang Ying (黄颖; born 14 February 1957) is a retired Chinese male water polo player who competed at the 1984 Summer Olympics.

He later coached the Canadian team at the 2001 Summer Universiade.

References

1957 births
Living people
Chinese male water polo players
Olympic water polo players of China
Water polo players at the 1984 Summer Olympics